The My Trach Massacre was a war crime by the French Army against  Vietnamese civilians in the First Indochina War. French soldiers committed the massacre in Mỹ Trạch village, Mỹ Thủy commune, Lệ Thủy District, Quảng Bình Province, Vietnam from 5 am to 8 am on November 29, 1947. The French Army burned 326 houses and murdered more than half of the village's residents. French soldiers raped many women before murdering them. The French Army murdered over 300 civilian residents in Mỹ Trạch, including 170 women and 157 children.

The location of the massacre was in the foot of Mỹ Trạch Bridge, a bridge on the North–South Railway, next to Mỹ Trạch Railway Station. French soldiers forced the victims to the foot of the bridge and lined them up before murdering them with machine gun fire.

Every year, residents of Mỹ Trạch mourn November 29 as "Hatred Date."

On December 27, 2001, The Ministry of Culture of Vietnam classified the memorial park in which the memorial site is located as one of the National Historical Relics of Vietnam.

References

Citations

External links 
 Quảng Bình Provincial Government

1947 in Vietnam
Anti-Vietnamese sentiment
First Indochina War
Massacres committed by France
Massacres in 1947
Massacres in Vietnam
Murdered Vietnamese children
November 1947 events in Asia
Quảng Bình province
Rape in Vietnam
Torture in Vietnam
Violence against women in Vietnam
Wartime sexual violence